The Museum of Sacred Art and Crypt is a museum in Santo António, Macau, China.

History
The museum was constructed at the former site of the College of the Mother of God and Church of Saint Paul. It was inaugurated on 23 October 1996.

Exhibitions
The museum exhibits objects of high historical and artistic value from different churches and convents of Macau. The crypt exhibits granite rock at the center of its area where it lies a tomb with walls decorated with Japanese and Vietnamese martyrs relics.

See also
 List of museums in Macau

References

1996 establishments in Macau
Macau Peninsula
Museums established in 1996
Museums in Macau